The 2018–19 Western Michigan Broncos men's basketball team represented Western Michigan University during the 2018–19 NCAA Division I men's basketball season. The Broncos were led by 16th-year head coach Steve Hawkins, and played their home games at University Arena as members of the West Division of the Mid-American Conference. They finished the season 8–24 overall, 2–16 in MAC play to finish in last place in the West Division. As the No. 12 seed in the MAC tournament, they lost in the first round to Central Michigan.

Previous season
The Broncos finished the 2016–17 season 17–15, 9–9 in MAC play to finish fourth in the West Division. As the No. 8 seed in the MAC tournament, they lost in the first round to Akron.

Offseason

Departures

Incoming Transfers

Recruiting class of 2018

Recruiting class of 2019

Roster

Schedule and results

|-
!colspan=9 style=|Exhibition

|-
!colspan=9 style=|Non-conference regular season

|-
!colspan=9 style=| MAC regular season

|-
!colspan=9 style=| MAC tournament

Source

See also
 2018–19 Western Michigan Broncos women's basketball team

References

Western Michigan
Western Michigan Broncos men's basketball seasons